Volleyball events were contested at the 1990 Central American and Caribbean Games in Mexico City, Mexico.

Notes

References
 

1990 Central American and Caribbean Games
1990
1990 in volleyball
International volleyball competitions hosted by Mexico